Gunasekara is a monotypic genus of Sri Lankan araneomorph spiders in the family Tetrablemmidae containing the single species, Gunasekara ramboda. It was first described by Pekka T. Lehtinen in 1981, and is found in Sri Lanka.

See also
 List of Tetrablemmidae species

References

Spiders of Asia
Taxa named by Pekka T. Lehtinen
Tetrablemmidae